John Rawls (born 4 May 1972) is an actor from New Zealand.

Biography
He was born in England on 4 May 1972, and raised in Hamilton, New Zealand, after moving there at age six. He is known for playing the evil vampire Zurial in David Slade's 2008 vampire film 30 Days of Night. He appeared in the Hobbit films by Peter Jackson as the villain Yazneg through earlier reports stated that he would play another villain called Azog.
He is with the acting agency Kathryn Rawlings & Associates, based in Auckland.

Filmography

Film

Television

References

External links
 John Rawls
 

New Zealand male film actors
Living people
1972 births
21st-century New Zealand male actors
English emigrants to New Zealand
People from Hamilton, New Zealand